4-amino-3-methyl-1-naphthol is a synthetic menadione analog. It is also known as vitamin K7, and was named as such in 1950 when it was recognized as a compound with vitamin K activity.

It can be made from 2-methylnaphthalene or menadione. It forms a crystalline hydrochloride salt (C11H11NO·HCl) from hydrochloric acid. At least 1 g of the salt dissolves in 25 ml of water at 75 °C. The salt turns pink to dark violet on exposure to air and light.

4-Amino-3-methyl-1-naphthol or its hydrochloride have not been used as commercial medicinal forms of vitamin K unlike phylloquinone and menadione for example.

References

1-Naphthols
Vitamin K